Maharanipeta is a neighbourhood in the city of Visakhapatnam, India. One of the 46 mandals of Visakhapatnam District, it is under the administration of Visakhapatnam revenue division, and its headquarters is at Maharanipeta. It is bounded by Seethammadhara and Gopalapatnam mandals. The origin of this name is unknown. It is a zone for hospitals, including King George Hospital and several private hospitals. The medical college in Andhra Pradesh, Andhra Medical College is also located there.

Wards

Maharanipeta mandal consists of the wards of:

Transportation
APSRTC run buses to every corner to this area; with these routes:

References

Neighbourhoods in Visakhapatnam